The Faculty of Arts and Humanities is one of nine faculties at the RWTH Aachen University. It was found in 1965 and produced several notable individuals like Arnold Gehlen or Klaus Mehnert. Dean of the Faculty is Prof. Dr. phil. Christine Roll.

As located at a Technical University there are exceptional strong ties between the Humanities and Engineering in research and teaching. Only one example for this is the interdisciplinary academic program "Technical Communication" (in German "Technik-Kommunikation"), which was founded in 1999 and is coordinated by Prof. Dr. Eva-Maria Jakobs. The program is a cooperation of five Faculties at RWTH Aachen University.

Degrees awarded

The following Degrees are awarded:

 Bachelor of Science
 Master of Science
 Bachelor of Arts
 Master of Arts
 Diplom
 Magister
 Doctor

External links
 Faculty of Arts and Humanities (German version)
 Technical Communication (German version)

RWTH Aachen University